This is a list of  Hindu Temples in Kashmir.

Anantnag District

Amarnath Temple
Mamal Temple at Pahalgam
Shiva Bhagwati Temple Akingam
Martand Sun Temple
Bumzuva Cave and Temple
Verinag Temple

Baramulla District

Gulmarg Maharani temple
Shankaragaurishvara Temple at  Pattan

Ganderbal District

Kheer Bhawani at Tulmul 
Manasbal lake
Wangath Temple complex
Harmukh

Kulgam District
Kausar Nag

Pulwama District

Avantiswami Temple
Ancient Temple, Ladhoo
Jwala Ji Temple at Khrew

Shopian District
Kapalmochan Mandir
Mangla Mata Mandir  at Wachi

Srinagar District

Shankaracharya Temple
Hari Parbat
Zeashta Devi Shrine
Vichar Nag
Purshyar Mandir
Raghunath Mandir

See also

History of Kashmir
Kashmiri Hindus
Exodus of Kashmiri Hindus
Kashmir Valley

References

Hindu Temples
Kashmiri Hindus
Hindu temples in Jammu and Kashmir
Kashmir